Adventurer's Park is a small amusement park in the Bensonhurst section of Brooklyn in New York City. It is a concession located within the city-owned Nellie Bly Park, next to the Belt Parkway. The concession, also originally named Nellie Bly Park, features classic kiddie rides and arcade games as well as a Ferris wheel, go carts and miniature golf.

References

Amusement parks in New York (state)
Bensonhurst, Brooklyn
Parks in Brooklyn